This article is about the particular significance of the year 1939 to Wales and its people.

Incumbents

Archbishop of Wales – Charles Green, Bishop of Bangor
Archdruid of the National Eisteddfod of Wales
J.J. (outgoing)
Crwys (incoming)

Events
March–November - Aneurin Bevan is temporarily expelled from the Labour Party.
27 April - Ely Racecourse in Cardiff closes.
1 June - The submarine HMS Thetis sinks during trials in Red Wharf Bay, Anglesey. At least 98 men are lost.
Late August - Most paintings evacuated from the National Gallery in London to Wales.
3 September - World War II
Declaration of war by the United Kingdom on Nazi Germany following the German invasion of Poland on 1 September.
October - Construction at M. S. Factory, Valley in Flintshire of tunnels for storage of chemical weapons begins.
The first war-time civilian evacuees arrive in Wales.
Vickers-Armstrong opens an aircraft factory at Broughton, Flintshire, later taken over by De Havilland.
The Urdd establishes Ysgol Gymraeg yr Urdd, the first-ever Welsh-medium primary school, at Aberystwyth. In its first year the school consists of just seven pupils and one teacher, Norah Isaac. 
A government report shows that seven of the thirteen Welsh counties have the highest incidence of tuberculosis in the whole of England and Wales.
George Maitland Lloyd Davies becomes President of the pacifist group Heddychwyr Cymru.
Talybont Reservoir in the Brecon Beacons is completed to supply Newport.
Sea Roads is constructed in Penarth in the Modernist style

Arts and literature
August - For the first time ever, both chair and crown are withheld at the National Eisteddfod.
4 October - Poets Lynette Roberts and Keidrych Rhys marry.
John Roberts Williams becomes editor of Y Cymro.

Awards
National Eisteddfod of Wales (held in Denbigh)
National Eisteddfod of Wales: Chair - withheld
National Eisteddfod of Wales: Crown - withheld
National Eisteddfod of Wales: Prose Medal - John Gwilym Jones

New books

English language
B. L. Coombes - These Poor Hands
Richard Llewellyn - How Green Was My Valley
Howard Spring - Heaven Lies About Us

Welsh language
D. Gwenallt Jones - Ysgubau'r Awen
David James Jones - Hanes Athroniaeth: Y Cyfnod Groegaidd
Moelona - Ffynnonlloyw
Caradog Prichard - Terfysgoedd Daear

Music
William Ifor Jones makes his debut as conductor of the Bach Choir of Bethlehem.
Ivor Novello - The Dancing Years
Grace Williams - Four Illustrations for the Legend of Rhiannon

Film
Ray Milland stars in Hotel Imperial and Beau Geste.
Sheep Dog, featuring the shepherd Tom Jones of Treorchy

Welsh language film
Efaciwis a Ricriwtio (World War II propaganda film)

Broadcasting
At the outbreak of war, the BBC was to transmit a unified service, including programs in the Welsh language.  One of the few Welsh-language broadcasts to survive is a daily bulletin of world news at 5 pm. It was broadcast before the daily news in English at 6pm.
The BBC radio comedy series It's That Man Again begins its ten-year run.  From 1940 to 1943 it will be broadcast from the BBC Wales studios in Bangor, Caernarvonshire, north Wales, where the BBC's Light Entertainment Department is temporarily based.

Sports
Rugby union
4 February – Leslie Manfield (one of only four players to represent Wales both before and after World War II) gains his first senior cap in the match between Wales and Scotland.

Births
11 January - Phil Williams, politician (died 2003)
16 February - David Griffiths, portrait painter
8 March - Robert Tear, operatic tenor (died 2011)
16 March - Kenny Morgans, footballer
29 March - Ronnie Williams, actor and comedian (died 1997)
7 April - Keith Bradshaw, Wales international rugby player
8 June - Norman Davies, historian
17 June - Donald Anderson, Baron Anderson of Swansea, politician
17 July - Spencer Davis, born Spencer Davies, beat musician, multi-instrumentalist (died 2020 in the United States)
21 July - Frank Rankmore, footballer
24 September - Steve Gammon, footballer
29 September - Rhodri Morgan, First Minister of Wales (died 2017)
10 October - Neil Sloane, mathematician
8 November - Meg Wynn Owen, actress

Deaths
27 January - Lewis Jones, miners' leader and novelist, 41
17 March - Owen Badger, Wales international rugby player, 67
24 March - Gwyn Nicholls, rugby player, 64
23 April - Morgan Jones, sitting MP for Llanelli, 52
29 April - Timothy Rees, Bishop of Llandaff, 64
14 June - Ivor Guest, 1st Viscount Wimborne, politician, 66
29 June - Sir Henry Stuart Jones, academic, 72
9 July - Charles Nicholl, Wales international rugby union player, 69
18 September - Gwen John, artist, 63
21 September - Sir John Lynn-Thomas, surgeon, 78
26 September - Leif Jones, politician, 77
7 November - Gwenllian Morgan, local politician, 87
2 December - Llewelyn Powys, writer, 55

See also
1939 in Northern Ireland

References

Wales